Thomson Reuters Foundation is a London-based charitable arm of Thomson Reuters, a Canadian news conglomerate. The Foundation is registered as a charity in the United States and United Kingdom and is headquartered in Canary Wharf, London.

Antonio Zappulla has been CEO since 2016.

History

Beginnings
In September 1997, the Reuters Foundation launched AlertNet, a website providing free humanitarian news and information. AlertNet was set up in the aftermath of the 1994 Rwanda genocide as a response to criticism of the slow media response and poorly coordinated activities of the relief agencies on the ground. AlertNet aimed to facilitate co-ordination among relief workers. In 2004, the Foundation created, Iraq's first independent national news agency, Aswat al-Iraq (Voices of Iraq), with support from the United Nations Development Programme (UNDP) and the Spanish International Cooperation Agency (AECI).

Thomson Reuters Foundation
Following the acquisition of Reuters by the Canadian group Thomson Corporation on 17 April 2008, the Foundation was transformed under the leadership of Monique Villa. The Foundation scaled down its grant making activities, revamped existing programs and launched new projects – all aimed at leveraging the skills and expertise of the company.

In January 2010, with the Haitian earthquake, the Foundation launched an Emergency Information Service (EIS) aimed at providing practical, life-saving information to survivors in local languages.

Key programmes

TrustLaw
TrustLaw is a legal program created in 2010 that connects the law firms and corporate legal teams with NGOs and social enterprises to provide legal pro bono.

Journalism and media training
From 1983, The Foundation provides skills-based training programmes to reporters worldwide in seven languages and across 170 countries. As of 2015, over 15,000 journalists have been trained internationally on 27 specialised training topics.

The Foundation also sets up and manages independent news platforms. The Foundation launched Aswat Masriya in 2011, an independent Egyptian news website which closed in 2017 due to lack of funding. Ahead of the country's first general elections in November 2015, the Foundation also launched Myanmar Now, a new portal dedicated to free and independent journalism in Myanmar led by Burmese journalists. The latter won the European Commission’s Lorenzo Natali Media Prize 2015 for a feature on underage sex workers.

Set up in 2006 and part of the Department of Politics and International Relations at the University of Oxford, the Foundation funds the Reuters Institute for the Study of Journalism (RISJ), a research centre for international comparative journalism.

In 2012, the Foundation was one of the co-founders of the European Press Prize.

Thomson Reuters Foundation News
The foundation has correspondents and freelancers in the major cities and developing nations. The editorial team led by Belinda Goldsmith covers human rights, inclusive economies and media freedom, including women's rights, LGBT+ rights, human trafficking and modern slavery, property rights and digital and climate change.

Perception polls
The Foundation has created polls for The World’s Most Dangerous Countries for Women (2011), Best and Worst G20 Countries for Women (2012), Best and Worst Arab League Countries for Women (2013), the Most Dangerous Transport Systems for Women (2014), and the Five Key Issues Facing Women Working in the G20 (2015). In 2018 the foundation released a poll that ranked India as the most dangerous country for women. The report was rejected by India's National Commission for Women and the Centre for the Study of Developing Societies and news media due to poor methodology and lack of transparency.

Trust Conference
Trust Conference, formerly Trust Women, works for law behind human rights and fight modern slavery. Past speakers have included Cherie Blair, Queen Noor of Jordan, and Nobel laureates Kailash Satyarthi and Muhammad Yunus.

As part of the Trust Women Conference's program, Monique Villa announced the launch of the Stop Slavery Award, a new initiative by the Thomson Reuters Foundation to recognise companies supporting the fight against modern slavery in their supply chains. The first Award was conferred in November 2016. Under the program, the Thomson Reuters Foundation worked with the office of the Manhattan District Attorney and major U.S. financial institutions to issue international guidance aimed at helping the wider financial communities to identify and report irregularities in financial transactions linked to human trafficking.

Awards 
 In 2015, The Foundation editorial team won the Asian Environmental Journalism Award for Excellence in Environmental Reporting by a Media Organisation, as well as a United Nations Correspondents Association UN Foundation prize.
 In 2012, AlertNet Climate was selected as an Official Honouree of the 16th Annual Webby Awards in the Green category.
 In 2011, AlertNet was awarded the "Voices of Courage" Award by the Women's Refugee Commission (WRC).
 In 2011, AlertNet was awarded an EPPY Award for the "Best News Website" category.
 In 2011, the Foundation received an EPPY Award for "Best Overall Website Design" for its online platform, Trust.org.
 AlertNet received a gold trophy for "Best News Site" at the Lovie Awards.
 In March 2011, the Foundation won the "Best Use of New Media" award for its Emergency Information Service (EIS) at the Third Annual Social Innovation Awards hosted by Justmeans.
 TrustMedia received a "Commended Company" designation by the Global Business Coalition on HIV/AIDS, Tuberculosis and Malaria for its innovative journalist training on health reporting.
 In 2010, the Foundation was awarded the Best Annual Report Award at the Digital Communications Awards.
 In 2010, "Surviving the Tsunami: Stories of Hope”, a Thomson Reuters Foundation multimedia documentary created for the fifth anniversary of the Indian Ocean tsunami, was nominated for an Emmy award and won a prize at the Best of Photojournalism Awards. The documentary was also a finalist in the 2010 Dart Awards for Excellence in Coverage of Trauma and named Best Web Special Feature by Editor & Publisher.
 AlertNet was named a Millennium Product by the British government, an award for outstanding application of innovative technology.

References

External links 
 
 Trust.org
 Thomson Reuters Foundation Annual Report 2013
 Trust Women Conference

Organizations established in 1982
Charities based in London
Foundations based in the United Kingdom
Foundations based in England
1982 establishments in England